Jordan's casque-headed tree frog (Trachycephalus jordani) is a species of frog in the family Hylidae found in Colombia, Ecuador, and Peru. Its natural habitats are subtropical or tropical dry forests, subtropical or tropical moist lowland forests, intermittent freshwater marshes, plantations, rural gardens, urban areas, and heavily degraded former forests. It is threatened by habitat loss.

References

Trachycephalus
Amphibians of Colombia
Amphibians of Ecuador
Amphibians of Peru
Amphibians described in 1891
Taxonomy articles created by Polbot